Bis(trimethylsilyl) sulfide is the chemical compound with the formula ((CH3)3Si)2S.  Often abbreviated (tms)2S, this colourless, vile-smelling liquid is a useful aprotic source of "S2−" in chemical synthesis.

Synthesis
The reagent is prepared by treating trimethylsilyl chloride with anhydrous sodium sulfide:
2 (CH3)3SiCl  +  Na2S  →  ((CH3)3Si)2S  +  2 NaCl

((CH3)3Si)2S must be protected from air because it hydrolyzes readily:
((CH3)3Si)2S  +  H2O  →  ((CH3)3Si)2O  +  H2S

Use in synthesis
Bis(trimethylsilyl)sulfide is a reagent for the conversion of metal oxides and chlorides into the corresponding sulfides.  This transformation exploits the affinity of silicon(IV) for oxygen and halides.  An idealized reaction is:
((CH3)3Si)2S  +  MO  →  ((CH3)3Si)2O  +  MS
In a similar way, it has been used in the conversion of aldehydes and ketones to the corresponding thiones.

Safety
((CH3)3Si)2S reacts exothermically with water, releasing toxic H2S.

References

Trimethylsilyl compounds
Sulfur(−II) compounds
Foul-smelling chemicals